The 1987 NFL draft was the procedure by which National Football League teams selected amateur college football players. It is officially known as the NFL Annual Player Selection Meeting. The draft was held April 28–29, 1987, at the Marriot Marquis in New York City, New York. The league also held a supplemental draft after the regular draft and before the regular season.

With the first overall pick of the draft, the Tampa Bay Buccaneers selected quarterback Vinny Testaverde.

Player selections

Round one

Round two

Round three

Round four

Round five

Round six

Round seven

Round eight

Round nine

Round ten

Round eleven

Round twelve

Hall of Famers
Rod Woodson, cornerback from Purdue, taken 1st round 10th overall by Pittsburgh Steelers
Inducted: Professional Football Hall of Fame class of 2009.
Cris Carter, wide receiver from Ohio State, taken in supplemental draft 4th round by Philadelphia Eagles
Inducted: Professional Football Hall of Fame class of 2013.

Notable undrafted players

References

External links
 NFL.com – 1987 Draft
 databaseFootball.com – 1987 Draft
 Pro Football Hall of Fame

National Football League Draft
NFL Draft
Draft
NFL Draft
NFL Draft
American football in New York City
1980s in Manhattan
Sporting events in New York City
Sports in Manhattan